Skater  may refer to:

Sports
Someone who practices skateboarding
Someone who practices roller skating
Someone who practices inline skating 
 Someone who practices ice skating
An ice hockey player who is not a goaltender
Skater (subculture), a subculture involving skateboarding

Arts and entertainment
Skater (band), a Slovenian dance music trio
Skaters (band), a New York rock band
The Skater, a 1782 painting by Gilbert Stuart
"The Skaters", a 1964 poem by John Ashbery

Other uses
Gerridae, a family of insects in the order Hemiptera, commonly known as water skater or pond skater

See also
Les Patineurs (disambiguation)
Skate (disambiguation)
Skating (disambiguation)